Stenoptilodes umbrigeralis is a moth of the family Pterophoridae that is known from Ecuador and Peru.

Adults are on wing in July.

External links

umbrigeralis
Moths described in 1864
Moths of South America